James Merry may refer to:
 James R. Merry (1927–2001), Republican member of the Pennsylvania House of Representatives
 James Merry (Scottish politician) (1805–1877), MP for Falkirk Burghs 1859–1874